|}

The Bar One Racing Juvenile Hurdle is a Grade 3 National Hunt novice hurdle race in Ireland which is open to horses aged three years old. 
It is run at Fairyhouse over a distance of about 2 miles (3,218 metres), and it is scheduled to take place each year in late November or early December.

The race was established in 1994, and it has held Grade 3 status throughout its history.

Records
Most successful jockey (4 wins):
 Davy Russell - 	Tharawaat (2008), Toner D'Oudairies (2010), Chief Justice (2018), Fil Dor (2021)  

Most successful trainer (5 wins): 
 Gordon Elliott -  Tharawaat (2008), Toner D'Oudairies (2010), Chief Justice (2018), Zanahiyr (2020), Fil Dor (2021)

Winners

See also
 Horse racing in Ireland
 List of Irish National Hunt races

References
Racing Post:
National Hunt hurdle races
National Hunt races in Ireland
Fairyhouse Racecourse
Recurring sporting events established in 1994
1994 establishments in Ireland